Plants+HC clade is a group of eukaryotes proposed by Burki et al. (2008). 

It includes:
 Plants
 Hacrobia (the "HC" refers to Cryptophyta and Haptophyta, the two major members of this group)

See also 
 photosynthesis

References 

Bikont unranked clades
Diaphoretickes